Guilherme Toldo (born 1 September 1992) is a Brazilian fencer. At the 2016 Summer Olympics he competed in the Men's foil, but was defeated in the quarter final.

He also competed in the 2012 Summer Olympics but was eliminated in the first round.

In the 2019 Pan American Fencing Championships he won a silver in the individual competition and bronze in the team.

He represented Brazil at the 2020 Summer Olympics.

References

External links

Brazilian male foil fencers
Living people
Olympic fencers of Brazil
Fencers at the 2012 Summer Olympics
1992 births
Pan American Games silver medalists for Brazil
Fencers at the 2016 Summer Olympics
Pan American Games medalists in fencing
Fencers at the 2011 Pan American Games
Medalists at the 2011 Pan American Games
Fencers at the 2020 Summer Olympics
Fencers at the 2015 Pan American Games
Medalists at the 2015 Pan American Games
Sportspeople from Porto Alegre
21st-century Brazilian people